ShowBIZ Data is a website that tracks domestic and international box office and other performance related information. Established by producer Oliver Eberle in 1997, and based on the principle that understanding the information based upon which movies are made is key to working in Hollywood, ShowBIZData.com is a comprehensive entertainment industry database online. The company's flagship service provides entertainment professionals and enthusiasts with a fast and easy way to obtain detailed information about the film industry.

Since 2012, the website (showbizdata.com) has not been active.

See also
 AICN
 The Movie Insider
 Cinema Blend
 Dark Horizons
 Joblo

External links
ShowBIZ Data

Film box office
American film websites
Internet properties established in 1997